Faveo is an ticket based support system built on the PHP based Laravel framework. The word Faveo comes from Latin, and means "to be favourable". It provides businesses with an automated helpdesk system to manage customer support. It has an inbuilt knowledge base for self-service by the customer.

The open source version is available for free download on GitHub, with plugin modules available to extend and expand its core functionality, including ResellerClub integration, Envato integration, LDAP authentication, MSG91 SMS integration, and Facebook social login.

Auto install Faveo using softaculous, AMPPS or Fantastico.

Faveo is being used in various industries such as manufacturing, health care, web hosting, IT and NGOs.

References

External links 
 Faveo Website
 faveo-helpdesk on GitHub

Help desk software
PHP software